Eliott Rodriguez (born June 6, 1956, in New York City) is a Cuban-American television journalist who has received two Emmy Awards and four Edward R. Murrow Awards.

Early life and education
Rodriguez was born in 1956 to Cuban immigrant parents in The Bronx, New York City. After graduating from the University of Miami, he began his journalism career as a reporter at The Miami News before becoming a reporter at WTVJ-Channel 4.

Career
After 2½ years, Rodriguez left Channel 4 for a reporting job at WPVI-TV in Philadelphia, where he also anchored the morning news. In 1987, he returned to Miami to take up a weekend co-anchor and general assignment reporter at WPLG-Channel 10 and remained there for 11 years. Rodriguez appeared in the 1996 film Up Close and Personal, playing the part of a television news reporter. He joined WFOR-TV (CBS4) in Miami in 1999, where he is currently the main news anchor and hosts the weekly public affairs program 4Sunday Morning. In January 2008, he was replaced by Antonio Mora as the main anchor; Rodriguez went to the Noon and 5:30 newscasts. In December 2012, when Mora's contract was not renewed, Rodriguez went back to the 5:00, 6:00, and 11:00 weekday newscasts.

Rodriguez received two Emmy Awards for local news reporting in 2001 and 2004 and two Edward R. Murrow Awards.

Personal life
He was married to Univision anchor Maria Elena Salinas for 13 years before they divorced in 2007.

References

External links

1956 births
Living people
American people of Cuban descent
Television anchors from Miami
People from the Bronx
University of Miami School of Communication alumni
Journalists from New York City